Deverre is an unincorporated community in Garfield County, Nebraska, United States.  Its elevation is 2,431 feet (741 m).  It lies north of Burwell, which is the county seat.

History
Deverre was named for Deverre Cass.  A post office in Deverre was established in 1905, and remained in operation until it was discontinued in 1933.

References

Unincorporated communities in Garfield County, Nebraska
Unincorporated communities in Nebraska